Amechedia is a monotypic snout moth genus described by Hans Georg Amsel in 1961. It contains the species Amechedia pagmanella, described in the same publication. It is found in Iran.

References

Phycitinae
Monotypic moth genera
Moths of Asia
Taxa named by Hans Georg Amsel